NASSP may refer to:

National Association of Secondary School Principals
North American Society for Social Philosophy
 National Astrophysics and Space Science Programme, the space research organization of South Africa